Kakinada airport is an airport project for the city of Kakinada, in the Kakinada district in the Indian state of Andhra Pradesh. The Airports Authority of India (AAI) has identified three possible locations at Pithapuram, Nemam and Mulapeta. Kakinada is a PCPIR (Petrol Chemical Petrochemical Investment Region). The airport nearest the city, Rajahmundry Airport, is 70 kilometers away.

A part of Airport Authority of India's new plan is develop 13 "no frill" airports in Andhra Pradesh along with 50 new airports across the country to meet the needs of rapid development of India's economy.

References 

Airports in Andhra Pradesh
Proposed airports in Andhra Pradesh
Buildings and structures in Kakinada district
Transport in Kakinada